Sainte-Ode is a municipality of Wallonia located in the province of Luxembourg, Belgium. 

On 1 January 2007, the municipality, which covers 97.87 km², had 2,305 inhabitants, giving a population density of 23.6 inhabitants per km².

The municipality consists of the following districts: Amberloup (town centre), Lavacherie, and Tillet. Other population centers include:

References

External links
 
 Web site Lavacherie

 
Municipalities of Luxembourg (Belgium)